Benjamin Schwartz may refer to:
Benjamin I. Schwartz (1916-1999), American academic, political scientist, and sinologist
Ben Schwartz (born 1981), American actor, comedian, writer, director and producer

See also
Benjamin Schwarz (disambiguation)
Benjamin Shwartz (born 1979), American-Israeli composer